This page lists all described species of the spider family Titanoecidae accepted by the World Spider Catalog :

Anuvinda

Anuvinda Lehtinen, 1967
 A. escheri (Reimoser, 1934) (type) — India, China, Laos, Thailand
 A. milloti (Hubert, 1973) — Nepal

Goeldia

Goeldia Keyserling, 1891
 G. arnozoi (Mello-Leitão, 1924) — Brazil
 G. chinipensis Leech, 1972 — Mexico
 G. luteipes (Keyserling, 1891) — Brazil, Argentina
 G. mexicana (O. Pickard-Cambridge, 1896) — Mexico
 G. nigra (Mello-Leitão, 1917) — Brazil
 G. obscura (Keyserling, 1878) — Colombia, Peru
 G. patellaris (Simon, 1893) (type) — Venezuela to Chile
 G. tizamina (Chamberlin & Ivie, 1938) — Mexico
 G. zyngierae Almeida-Silva, Brescovit & Dias, 2009 — Brazil

Nurscia

Nurscia Simon, 1874
 N. albofasciata (Strand, 1907) — Russia (Far East), China, Korea, Taiwan, Japan
 N. albomaculata (Lucas, 1846) — Europe, Turkey, Egypt to Central Asia
 N. albosignata Simon, 1874 (type) — South-eastern and eastern Europe to Central Asia
 N. sequerai (Simon, 1893) — Portugal to France

Pandava

Pandava Lehtinen, 1967
 P. andhraca (Patel & Reddy, 1990) — India
 P. aruni Bodkhe, Uniyal, Kamble, Manthen, Santape & Chikhale, 2017 — India
 P. ganesha Almeida-Silva, Griswold & Brescovit, 2010 — India
 P. ganga Almeida-Silva, Griswold & Brescovit, 2010 — India
 P. hunanensis Yin & Bao, 2001 — China
 P. kama Almeida-Silva, Griswold & Brescovit, 2010 — India
 P. laminata (Thorell, 1878) (type) — Tanzania, Kenya, Madagascar, India, Sri Lanka to China, Indonesia, Philippines, Micronesia, French Polynesia. Introduced to Britain, Netherlands, Germany, Poland, Hungary
 P. nathabhaii (Patel & Patel, 1975) — India
 P. sarasvati Almeida-Silva, Griswold & Brescovit, 2010 — Myanmar, Thailand
 P. shiva Almeida-Silva, Griswold & Brescovit, 2010 — India, Pakistan

† Scytodes

† Scytodes Latreille, 1804
 † S. marginalis Wunderlich, 2004 
 † S. piliformis Wunderlich, 1988 
 † S. planithorax Wunderlich, 1988 
 † S. stridulans Wunderlich, 1988 
 † S. weitschati Wunderlich, 1993

Titanoeca

Titanoeca Thorell, 1870
 T. altaica Song & Zhou, 1994 — China
 T. americana Emerton, 1888 — North America
 T. asimilis Song & Zhu, 1985 — Russia (South Siberia), Kazakhstan, Mongolia, China
 T. brunnea Emerton, 1888 — USA, Canada
 T. caspia Ponomarev, 2020 — Russia (Europe, Caucasus)
 T. caucasica Dunin, 1985 — Azerbaijan, Turkey, Iran
 T. deltshevi Naumova, 2019 — Bulgaria
 T. eca Marusik, 1995 — Kazakhstan
 T. flavicoma L. Koch, 1872 — France (Corsica), Italy, Albania, North Macedonia, Bulgaria, Greece, Russia (Europe)
 T. guayaquilensis Schmidt, 1971 — Ecuador
 T. gyirongensis Hu, 2001 — China
 T. hispanica Wunderlich, 1995 — Spain, France
 T. incerta (Nosek, 1905) — Turkey
 T. lehtineni Fet, 1986 — Central Asia, Iran?
 T. lianyuanensis Xu, Yin & Bao, 2002 — China
 T. liaoningensis Zhu, Gao & Guan, 1993 — Russia (South Siberia), Mongolia, China
 T. mae Song, Zhang & Zhu, 2002 — China
 T. minuta Marusik, 1995 — Kazakhstan
 T. monticola (Simon, 1870) — Portugal, Spain, France
 T. nigrella (Chamberlin, 1919) — North America
 T. nivalis Simon, 1874 — North America, Scandinavia, Pyrenees (Spain, France), Alps (France, Switzerland, Austria, Italy), Georgia, Russia (Middle Siberia to Far East)
 T. praefica (Simon, 1870) — Portugal, Spain, France, Algeria, Russia (Europe)
 T. quadriguttata (Hahn, 1833) (type) — Europe, Russia (Europe to South Siberia), Kazakhstan, China
 T. schineri L. Koch, 1872 — Europe, Turkey, Caucasus, Russia (Europe to South Siberia), Iran, Central Asia
 T. sharmai (Bastawade, 2008) — India
 T. spominima (Taczanowski, 1866) — Sweden, Central Europe
 T. tristis L. Koch, 1872 — Europe, Caucasus
 T. turkmenia Wunderlich, 1995 — Albania, Bulgaria, Greece, Russia (Europe), Kazakhstan, Iran, Turkmenistan
 T. ukrainica Guryanova, 1992 — Ukraine, Russia (Europe)
 T. veteranica Herman, 1879 — Central, South-eastern and Eastern Europe, Russia (Europe to South Siberia), Azerbaijan, Kazakhstan, Turkmenistan

References

Titanoecidae